The Bougainvillea Handicap was a Thoroughbred horse race run between 1940 and 2001 at Hialeah Park in Hialeah, Florida. A race for horses age three and older, it was run at a distance of 1 1/8 miles on turf. The race was named for the purple bougainvillea flower which is an integral part of the track's floral blueprint.

History
The inaugural running in 1940 was won by William F. Mannagh's Liberty Flight. Sent off by the betting public at odds of more than 10:1, he was the longshot of the seven starters. In a rare occurrence, the second-place finisher High One had the second longest odds and third-place finisher Dunade had the third longest odds. Armor Bearer, the betting favorite, finished last.

In 1964, Parka set a new course record of 1:53 4/5 in winning the Bougainvillea Handicap. He returned to Hialeah the following year to win the race again in exactly the same time.

In 1970, Secretariat's Hall of Fame jockey Ron Turcotte aboard Vent du Nord became the only jockey to ever win the "Hialeah Turf Series", three races consisting of the Palm Beach, Bougainvillea and Hialeah Turf Cup Handicaps.

In 1973 the Graded stakes race system was recorded for the first time in the United States. The February 10, 1973 edition of the Bougainvillea Handicap was awarded Grade 2 status. This historical event was won by Gleaming, owned by the renowned Calumet Farm of Lexington, Kentucky.

The final running of the Bougainville Handicap took place on March 31, 2001 and was won by Make No Mistake, owned by Walter Haefner's Moyglare Stud Farm.

Records
Speed record:
 1:46.04 @ 1 miles : Signal Tap (1996)
 1:51 4/5 @ 1 miles : Toonerville (1976)

Most wins:
 2 – Frere Jacques (1947, 1949)
 2 – Chicle (1950, 1951)
 2 – Parka (1964, 1965)
 2 – London Company (1974, 1975)
 2 – Flying Pidgeon (1985, 1986)
 2 – Sharp Appeal (1997, 1998)

Most wins by a jockey:
 4 – Ángel Cordero Jr. (1971, 1973, 1974, 1978)
 4 – José A. Santos ( 1985, 1986, 1997, 2001)

Most wins by a trainer:
 3 – LeRoy Jolley (1974, 1975, 1983) (Note: subject to change due to 4 missing names)

Most wins by an owner:
 2 – Jacob Sher (1947, 1949)
 2 – Palatine Stable (Frank Rosen) (1950, 1951)
 2 – Hasty House Farm (1956, 1958)
 2 – Pelican Stable (Rachel Carpenter) (1964, 1965)
 2 – Calumet Farm (1966, 1973)
 2 – Chance Hill Farm (1974, 1975)
 2 – Constance Daparma / Armand Marcanthony (1985, 1986)
 2 – Martin L. Cherry (1997, 1998)

Winners

 † 1966 – Kentucky Jug and Lord Date ran a dead heat for first.

External links
B&W Photo collection titled: Collection titled 57 Old Photos of Hialeah Park in All its Architectural Grandeur

References

Discontinued horse races
Open mile category horse races
Graded stakes races in the United States
Turf races in the United States
Horse races in Florida
Hialeah Park
Recurring sporting events established in 1940
Recurring sporting events disestablished in 2001
1940 establishments in Florida
2001 disestablishments in Florida